In an Islamic context, Bani Isra'il ( Banī Isrā'īl "sons of Israel")  (Biblical Hebrew: b'nei yisrael, בְּנֵי יִשְׂרָאֵל) may refer to:

People
 Descendants of the 12 sons of Jacob, including Joseph
 Children of Israel or Israelites
 Jewish people
 Ten Lost Tribes
 Twelve Tribes of Israel

See also
 Surat Bani Isra'il or Al-Isra', chapter of the Quran
 Qubur Bani Isra'il, "Tombs of the Children of Israel" in West Bank
 Bani Israël, a village in Senegal
 Bene Israel, a community of Jews in India
 Banu Israil, Muslim community of India
 Ben-Israel
 B'nai Israel (disambiguation), various congregations
 Ben Yehuda (disambiguation)
 Bar Yehuda
 Ben-Israel